The Wretches Are Still Singing is a 1979 Greek dramatic experimental independent surrealist underground art film directed by Nikos Nikolaidis. It is the first part of the "Years of Cholera" trilogy continuing with Sweet Bunch (1983) and ending with The Loser Takes It All (2002).

Plot
The director studied the transformation of social values using the example of a group of five friends who meet after a long separation and share with each other the details of their difficult lives. The film became the symbol of the 1950s generation and reflected his personal views on the problem of alienation in the modern world. The film was shot in a surreal way with a predilection for the aesthetics of the Marquis de Sade. In it, for the first time in Nikolaidis' filmography, one can see the characteristic elements of film noir which became part and parcel of Nikolaidis' unique approach in the majority of the films that followed. The film follows four men who had been adolescents in the 1950s and are now in their forties. A fifth person, a woman, who has been in and out of psychiatric hospitals due to unspecified disorders, also appears. Efi Papazachariou, who wrote an article about it in World Film Locations: Athens, stated that it is "one of the most unconventional Greek films."

Accolades
The film won the Best Director Award and the Athens Film Critics Association Best Picture Award at the Thessaloniki Festival of Greek Cinema in September 1979, where, furthermore, Hristos Valavanidis won the Best Actor Award, Marinos Athanasopoulos won the Best Sound Recordist Award, and Andreas Andreadakis won the Best Editor Award.

Cast
Alkis Panagiotidis as Alkis
Konstantinos Tzoumas as Konstantinos
Rita Bensousan as Rita
Christos Valavanidis as Hristos
Dora Kalogridi as Dora
Gioula Kazoni as Thief
Maritina Passari
Antigoni Amanitou as White Clothes-Wearing Lady
Youla Anagnostou
Dimitris Politimos as Dimitris
Olia Lazaridou as Vera

References

Further reading
Peter Cowie, International Film Guide 1981, London: Tantivy Press, 1981, 512 pages.
Νίκος Γεωργίου Νικολαΐδης, Τα Κουρέλια Τραγουδάνε Ακόμα...: Σενάριο, Αθήνα: Εκδόσεις Γνώση, 1980, 97 σελίδες.

External links
The Wretches Are Still Singing at Nikos Nikolaidis (Film Director/Writer/Producer)

The Wretches Are Still Singing at the Greek Film Archive Film Museum: Home Page Digital Archives, Filmography
The Wretches Are Still Singing at 5 Books, 6 Films, and... Nikos Nikolaidis: Films

The Wretches Are Still Singing at The New York Times Movies

1970s avant-garde and experimental films
1979 drama films
1979 independent films
1979 films
Films directed by Nikos Nikolaidis
Films set in Greece
Films set in psychiatric hospitals
Films shot in Greece
Greek drama films
1970s Greek-language films
Greek avant-garde and experimental films